Lola Versus Powerman and the Moneygoround, Part One, commonly abbreviated to Lola Versus Powerman, or simply Lola, is the eighth studio album by the English rock band the Kinks, recorded and released in 1970. A concept album, it is a satirical appraisal of the music industry, including song publishers, unions, the press, accountants, business managers, and life on the road. Musically Lola Versus Powerman is varied, described by Stephen Thomas Erlewine as "a wildly unfocused but nonetheless dazzling tour de force", containing some of Ray Davies's strongest songs.

Although it appeared during a transitional period for the Kinks, Lola Versus Powerman was a success both critically and commercially for the group, charting in the Top 40 in America and helping restore them in the public eye, making it a "comeback" album. It contained two hit singles: "Lola", which reached the top 10 in the US and UK, and "Apeman", which peaked at number five in the UK.

In October 2020, Sanctuary Records released a 3-disc 50th Anniversary set that includes 36 extra tracks that include B-sides, outtakes, new mixes and alternate versions.

A second part never followed Part One.

Background and recording 

The Kinks' ban by the American Federation of Musicians on performing in America, which had been in force since their 1965 US tour, was lifted in 1969, so the group's management arranged a North American tour. However, members of the band fell ill, and the tour was shuffled, resulting in the band playing only a few dates in America and Canada. A follow-up tour in 1970 met with similar results, with the group performing at only a select number of venues, with many dates cancelled. The down time between the tours allowed Ray Davies, lead singer and songwriter of the group, to develop the band's next single, "Lola".

The Kinks returned to England to start work on their new LP in spring 1970. The group used Morgan Studios, an independent studio in Willesden, London, which was a change for them. They would continue recording their albums there until Preservation, when they switched to their newly purchased studio, Konk. Recording began in late April/early May. Some of the first songs recorded were "Lola", the outtake "The Good Life", "Powerman" and "Got to Be Free". The sessions for "Lola" were especially long, and the recording continued into late May. Davies would recall later how he achieved the signature clangy sound at the beginning of the track:

 The National Steel would play an integral part in many Kinks projects after that. In the 1972 song "Supersonic Rocket Ship", Ray Davies would use the guitar to create a Caribbean feel for the record. Davies would play it on numerous Top of the Pops appearances, and it would be featured in several music videos the Kinks made in the future, including "Scattered" in 1992.

Keyboardist John Gosling was added to the Kinks' lineup in May. He auditioned on the final backing master track for "Lola", and was hired soon after. He was initially taken on solely for their upcoming US tour, but his post evolved into a more permanent position soon after. Gosling would remain with the band until 1978, departing after the release of Misfits. Dubbing for "Lola" was finished in June. Recording for the LP was completed by October, and it was mixed throughout the remainder of the month. Lola Versus Powerman and the Moneygoround, Part One was released on 27 November 1970.

For "Lola", Ray Davies overdubbed the trademarked word "Coca-Cola" with the generic "cherry cola" for the mono single release, as product placement rules meant the BBC (being a public service broadcaster) would not have played it. The lyrics in the gatefold sleeve of the original LP use the "cherry cola" line, though the album track contains the original stereo "Coca-Cola" version. A similar situation was encountered with the song "Apeman", concerning the line "the air pollution is a-foggin' up my eyes". "Fogging" was mistaken for "fucking", and consequently Ray Davies had to re-record this line prior to its single release.

Themes 

The album is a satirical look at the various facets of the music industry, including song publishers ("Denmark Street"), unions ("Get Back in Line"), the press and the hit-making machine ("Top of the Pops"), accountants and business managers ("The Moneygoround") and the road ("This Time Tomorrow"). Musically, Lola Versus Powerman is varied, contrasting gentle ballads like "Get Back in Line" and "A Long Way from Home" against hard rock songs like "Rats" and "Powerman", with "Denmark Street" and "The Moneygoround" paying homage to the English music hall tradition.

Critical reception 

Lola Versus Powerman was well-received throughout the British music press. A review in New Musical Express called "[Ray] Davies ... one of the finest writers in contemporary rock," and praised the record's British styles and originality. Melody Makers interpretation of Lola Versus Powerman was Davies "taking a cheeky nibble" at the pop music business; they continued that "The music's pure Kinks simplicity—but it works."

The album received generally positive reviews in the US. Rolling Stone magazine commented that it was "the best Kinks album yet". Village Voice critic Robert Christgau commented that "Lola" had been an "astounding single," but gave Lola Versus Powerman a lukewarm review, saying that "the melodies are still there, but in this context they sound corny rather than plaintive." The single "Lola" received positive reviews, and, due to its success, an interview with Ray Davies by Jonathan Cott was featured as a cover story for Rolling Stone in November 1970.

Reappraisal
Modern critical opinion towards Lola Versus Powerman is generally positive but often mixed. Initially given a positive review by the magazine in 1971, Rolling Stone rated it 31/2 out of 5 stars in its 1992 printing—however, the fourth edition (published in 2004) ranked it at only 2 stars. Stephen Thomas Erlewine of Allmusic gave the album a positive review, writing that "Davies never really delivers a cohesive story, but the record holds together because it's one of his strongest sets of songs."

Commercial performance 
Lola Versus Powerman and the Moneygoround, Part One went virtually unnoticed by the record-buying public in the UK and failed to chart, despite the success of its lead single, "Lola", which topped the New Musical Express charts in the UK, and reached #2 on Melody Maker. "Lola" became the Kinks' biggest success since "Sunny Afternoon" in 1966; the group would never again have another single reach this position in the UK. "Lola" was also successful in the US market, charting at #9 on the Billboard Hot 100 singles chart, staying on the charts for 14 weeks. It also peaked at #7 on the Record World charts. Lola Versus Powerman and the Moneygoround, Part One reached #35 on Billboard, and on the Record World charts it peaked at #22, making it their most successful album since the mid-60s.

Aftermath and legacy 
The success of the singles and album allowed the Kinks to negotiate a new contract with RCA Records, construct their own London Studio, which they named Konk, and assume more creative and managerial control. The record also proved influential: Tom Petty told Rolling Stone that he "especially liked" it, and cited the album as an influence on The Last DJ, another album critical of the music industry.

Tracks from Lola Versus Powerman have been featured in multiple films across several languages. One of the most notable uses of songs from the album was when "This Time Tomorrow", "Strangers", and "Powerman" were featured in the 2007 Wes Anderson film The Darjeeling Limited; these tracks were later included on the accompanying soundtrack album. In France, "This Time Tomorrow" appeared in the 2005 Philippe Garrel film Les amants réguliers. "Apeman" has been featured in multiple films, including Mondovino (2004) and Harold Ramis' Club Paradise (1986).

Ray Davies adapted the album into an autobiographical drama, with the help of co-writer Paul Sirett, including new versions of songs from the album. This was broadcast on BBC Radio 4 in December 2021.

Part Two 
Before the release of Lola Versus Powerman and the Moneygoround, Part One the band discussed the possibility of it being released as a double album. According to Doug Hinman's book, The Kinks: All Day and All of the Night, a sequel album was planned for release sometime in 1971, but was ultimately scrapped and the band opted to record Muswell Hillbillies instead. Due to the fact that an official title to the follow-up album was never revealed, Hinman refers to the album simply as Part Two and suggests that preliminary sessions may have occurred in late 1970/early 1971. It is unclear what songs would have appeared on this album, and it is unknown if any songs were even recorded, with the possible exception of some unreleased backing tracks. Almost certainly no songs were completed or mastered.

Ray Davies addressed the question of the unfinished sequel in a 2014 Uncut interview: Lola Versus Powerman… was good versus evil, obviously, and in Volume Two, I sketched out how you become your worst nightmare, how the good man goes so far he becomes the evil person he always fought against. But we had to do another tour, we had the RCA deal, and we had other recording projects that we had to work towards, and it got lost, unfortunately.

Track listing 

Notes
Some CD editions separate the first 40 seconds of "The Contenders" as its own track titled "Introduction"
The 2014 Deluxe edition included the Kinks' following album Percy as a second disc, also with bonus tracks. The 2-disc set is titled Lola versus Powerman and The Moneygoround and Percy.

B-sides

Personnel 
The Kinks
Ray Davies – lead vocals, guitar, harmonica, keyboards, resonator guitar
Dave Davies – lead guitar, banjo, backing vocals, lead vocals on "Strangers" and "Rats", co-lead vocal on "Powerman"
John Dalton – bass guitar, backing vocals
Mick Avory – drums, percussion
John Gosling – keyboards, piano, organ

Charts

Weekly charts

Singles 
All positions sourced to except where noted.

References

Sources 
 
 
 
 
 
 
 
 
 
 

1970 albums
The Kinks albums
Pye Records albums
Albums produced by Ray Davies
Albums recorded at Morgan Sound Studios
Concept albums